Noah Karl Anders Persson (born 16 July 2003) is a Swedish professional footballer who plays as a midfielder for Mjällby AIF, on loan from Swiss Super League club Young Boys.

Club career
Noah Persson's mother club is Asarums IF. As a 15-year-old, he made the move to Mjällby AIF.

Shortly after his 18th birthday, he made his Allsvenskan debut in Mjällby AIF, when he made an appearance as a full-back in the 2-2 match against Örebro SK on 7 August 2021. Later that month, Persson signed a first team contract with Mjällby AIF.

On 7 February 2023 Persson was sold to Swiss club BSC Young Boys for an undisclosed 'double digit million fee' which makes Persson the most expensive player ever sold by Mjällby. Persson was than loaned back to Mjällby until May 2023.

International career 
Persson made his full international debut for Sweden on 9 January 2023, playing for 90 minutes in a friendly 2–0 win against Finland.

Career statistics

International

References

External links

2003 births
Living people
Swedish footballers
Sweden international footballers
Association football midfielders
Mjällby AIF players
Allsvenskan players